The 2019 FIBA U16 Women's European Championship was the 31st edition of the Women's European basketball championship for national under-16 teams. It was held from 22 to 30 August in Skopje, North Macedonia. The top five teams qualified for the 2020 FIBA Under-17 Women's Basketball World Cup in Romania besides Romania who automatically qualified as host.

Venues

Participating teams

  (Third place, 2018 FIBA U16 Women's European Championship Division B)

  (Runners-up, 2018 FIBA U16 Women's European Championship Division B)

 

  (Winners, 2018 FIBA U16 Women's European Championship Division B)

First round

Group A

Group B

Group C

Group D

Knockout stage

Championship bracket

Final

5th place bracket

9th place bracket

13th place bracket

Final standings

Awards

All-Tournament Team 
  Sara Roumy
  Marta Morales
  Justė Jocytė
  Anastasiia Kosu
  Audronė Zdanavičiūtė

References

External links
FIBA official website

2019
2019–20 in European women's basketball
2019–20 in North Macedonia basketball
International youth basketball competitions hosted by North Macedonia
Sports competitions in Skopje
FIBA U16
August 2019 sports events in Europe